Hotel Terme Millepini is a four-star hotel in Montegrotto Terme, Padua, Italy. It contains 100 rooms and until 2020 was recognized for having the world's deepest pool, the Y-40, which put it in the Guinness World Records. The hotel was first built in 1997 and renovated in 2013.

Y-40 pool

Y-40 "The Deep Joy" pool first opened on 5 June 2014 and was designed by architect Emanuele Boaretto. It contains 
The pool features underwater caves and a suspended, transparent, underwater tunnel for guests to walk through. The hotel offers tickets to freedive and scuba dive. Italian freediver Umberto Pelizzari first measured the depth before the pool was open.

When it opened on 5 June 2014, it was awarded the "Deepest Swimming Pool for Diving" by the Guinness World Records. That record was previously held by the Nemo 33 pool in Belgium.

Y-40 now stands as the third deepest swimming pool in the world, exceeded only by Deepspot in Poland, and Deep Dive Dubai in the United Arab Emirates.

Gallery

See also

 Blue Abyss
 Deepspot
 Deep Dive Dubai
 Nemo 33

References

External links
Hotel website
Pool website

Hotels in Italy
Hotels established in 1997
Hotel Terme Millepini
Underwater diving sites in Italy
Research and development in the United Kingdom
Swimming pools
Swimming venues in Italy
World record holders